David Henry Bohm (born November 4, 1968) is an American bicycle framebuilder and owner of Bohemian Bicycles.

Early life and education

David Bohm was born in Chicago, Illinois.  At age 6 his family moved to Tucson, Arizona where he spent his childhood.

He attended Colorado Rocky Mountain School where he learned welding and silver smithing.

After high school he attended college at Lake Forest College and the University of Arizona

Bicycle racing career

Bohm had a brief career in Category 2 racing.

Framebuilding career

Bohm began making bicycle frames in 1994.  He is a graduate of United Bicycle Institute in Ashland, Oregon.  The same year he founded Bohemian Bicycles.

Since that time he has won numerous awards.  Most recently People's Choice and Best Tandem at the North American Handmade Bicycle Show in 2007.  Bohm has been written up in such magazines as Triathlete, Dirt Rag, various German and English publications, auto magazine, Tandem-Recumbent magazine and the Tucson Citizen newspaper.

References

 Bohemian Bicycles
 Sheldon Brown
 United bicycle institute
  Sands Machine
  Velo Retro
 Classic Rendezvous, USA Framebuilders

1968 births
Cycle designers
Lake Forest College alumni
Living people